Hell (a.k.a. Gehenna, Hades, Hel, Jahannam, Sheol and Tartarus) is a fictional location, an infernal Underworld utilized in various American comic book stories published by DC Comics. It is the locational antithesis of the Silver City in Heaven. The DC Comics location known as Hell is heavily based on its depiction in Abrahamic mythology. Although several versions of Hell had briefly appeared in other DC Comics publications in the past, the official DC Comics concept of Hell was first properly established when it was mentioned in The Saga of the Swamp Thing (vol. 2) #25–27 (June–August 1984) and was first seen in Swamp Thing Annual #2 (1985), all of which were written by Alan Moore and illustrated by Stephen Bissette and John Totleben.

The hierarchy of Hell, specifically the triumvirate of Lucifer, Azazel, and Beelzebub, was first referred to in John Constantine, Hellblazer #12 (December 1988) ("The Devil You Know..." (page 6) by Jamie Delano and Richard Piers Rayner) and first appeared in The Sandman (vol. 2) #4 (April 1989) ("A Hope in Hell" by Neil Gaiman and Sam Kieth). In the story, Lucifer had been forced to accept the position of the ruler of Hell due to the disruption caused by the Great Evil Beast's attack on Creation during the Crisis on Infinite Earths in the 16-part storyline "American Gothic" in Swamp Thing (vol. 2) #35–50 (April 1985–July 1986). John Constantine, Hellblazer, would also later add in the First of the Fallen, who preceded Lucifer and his failed rebellion in Heaven. In Who's Who in the DC Universe #11 (July 1991), the entry on "Hell's Hierarchy" included all the elements of Gaiman's version, plus John Constantine the Hellblazer's demonic enemy Nergal, Agony and Ecstasy the Slave-Twins of the Inquisition, Asteroth, Abaddon the Destroyer, Morax and Superman's demonic enemy Blaze, who, along with her brother Satanus, came to rule Hell in the eight-issue miniseries Reign in Hell (September 2008–April 2009, also including DC Universe Special: Reign in Hell #1 (August 2008).

Publication history
Because of the multiplicity of imprints and acquisitions under the DC Comics umbrella, there have been many different versions of both "Satan" and "Hell".

At Quality Comics in 1942, the superhero known as Midnight encountered the Devil and his domineering Wife after his untimely death. At Fawcett Comics in 1942, Ibis the Invincible I (Prince Amentep) confronted a demonic entity who inexplicably named itself "Satan". At DC Comics, the pages of Showcase #60 (January–February 1966) featured the first appearance of Azmodus and Justice League of America #49 (November 1966) introduced the demon Abaddon, who possessed a farmer named Hiram Spiezel. DC Comics' interpretation of Lucifer debuted in a dream sequence in Superman's Pal Jimmy Olsen #65 (December 1962). Lucifer was introduced for real in DC Special Series #8 (1978), a.k.a. The Brave and the Bold Special, which teamed up the Batman I (Bruce Wayne), Sgt. Franklin John "Frank" Rock and Deadman and depicted Lucifer being summoned by the ghosts of Guy Fawkes, Benedict Arnold, Adolf Hitler, Jack the Ripper, Nero and Bluebeard and controlling a human operative named Edward Dirkes. Jason Blood had a nightmare about Hell in Jack Kirby's The Demon #14 (November 1973), but otherwise, the concept was in absentia other than through retcon. Etrigan the Demon debuted in the first issue of the 16-issue Jack Kirby series The Demon (August–September 1972–January 1974), but Hell was never actually mentioned, seen or shown in a concrete manner in any of the original Demon stories until The Saga of the Swamp Thing (vol. 2) #25–27 (June–August 1984), in which Alan Moore made the first canonical claim for Etrigan the Demon being a denizen of Hell, referring to his promotion to a Rhyming Demon and having him speak consistently in rhyme, which he did not do at all during the Kirby series. Many stories in DC's various mystery and horror anthology titles featured "Satan" and at least one, in Weird Mystery Tales #4 (January–February 1973), featured Lucifer, but these stories may or may not be in mainstream DC Universe continuity. Satan did appear, along with an angelic pre-Fall Etrigan the Demon, in one of the four possible origins of the Phantom Stranger (three of which are Judeo-Christian inspired, the fourth, science fiction inspired) in Secret Origins (vol. 2) #10 (January 1987).

Aside from the above-mentioned stories, Hell made its actual first appearance in Swamp Thing Annual #2 (1985). Subsequently, it would appear again in Swamp Thing (vol. 2) #49–50 (June–July 1986), in which there was a civil war going on in Hell and Etrigan the Demon was there. The Spectre's (James Brendan "Jim" Corrigan I) failure in his intervention in this conflict led to a reduction of his powers, as described in The Spectre (vol. 2) #1 (April 1987). While Hell appeared in the 31 issues (and one Annual (1988)) of that series (April 1987–November 1989), readers never saw any major developments outside of characters being condemned to go there and the occasional demon or demons tormenting them, such as in The Spectre (vol. 2) #21 (December 1988). Hell also appeared in the 31 issues (and one Annual (1985)) of Blue Devil (June 1984–December 1986; also including a special insert in the center of The Fury of Firestorm the Nuclear Man #24 (June 1984), which started the series). In The Sandman (vol. 2) #4 (April 1989), the rulers of Hell are introduced, a triumvirate consisting of Lucifer, a fallen angel deliberately drawn to resemble David Bowie, Azazel, a shadowy, many-eyed former djinn ("genie") (Azazel had previously appeared as an incubus in a Madame Xanadu story that was first published in Cancelled Comic Cavalcade #1 (summer 1978) and then was officially published in The Unexpected #190 (March–April 1978)) and Beelzebub, a high-ranking demon resembling a large fly. This triumvirate (albeit with Beelzebub referred to as Belial; possibly a continuity error) returned in Secret Origins (vol. 2) #48 (April 1990), presenting the never-before-told origin of Stanley and his Monster, in which Lucifer banishes a minor demon from Hell to Earth for being "too nice" for Hell, where he is discovered by Stanley Dover Junior, who names him Spot. This version of Hell is also depicted in the 58 issues (plus two Annuals (1992 and 1993) and one #0 issue (October 1994)) of The Demon (vol. 3) (July 1980–May 1995), the four-issue miniseries The Books of Magic (December 1990–March 1991) and the three-issue miniseries Kid Eternity (vol. 2) (May–October 1991) by Grant Morrison and Duncan Fegredo.

In Swamp Thing Annual #2, Hell was said to be a place that mortal beings went to only because they truly believed that they belonged there. During the fourth Sandman story arc, Season of Mists, in The Sandman (vol. 2) #21–28 (January–July 1991), Lucifer decides to abdicate the throne of Hell and forces all of these beings to leave it. He closes the gates of Hell behind him, locks them and gives the key to Dream of the Endless, who does not want it, and many divine beings, such as Odin, Bast and Shivering Jemmy of the Shallow Brigade, a Lord of Chaos, attempt to persuade him to give the key to them. Odin attempts to bribe Dream with the Twilight Dimension of Ragnarok from Last Days of the Justice Society of America Special #1 (1986), specifically because it contains his successor's grandfather, Hawkman I (Carter Hall (a.k.a. Prince Khufu Kha-Tarr)) and his protégé, the Sandman I (Wesley Bernard "Wes" Dodds), but this attempt fails, as do all of the others. Eventually, Dream gives the key to the angels Remiel and Duma, who, having been denied re-entry into the Silver City, reinstate Hell as a place of spiritual rehabilitation rather than eternal punishment. This version of Hell is also depicted in the four-issue miniseries Stanley and His Monster (vol. 2) (February–May 1993), Vertigo Visions: Phantom Stranger #1 (October 1993), a one-shot issue under the Vertigo imprint by Alisa Kwitney and Guy Davis, the 16-issue series Kid Eternity (vol. 3) (May 1993–September 1994) by Ann Nocenti and Sean Phillips, also under the Vertigo imprint (albeit with Beelzebub having taken human form) and Batman #544–546 (July–September 1997), which guest-starred Etrigan the Demon.

John Constantine, Hellblazer under Garth Ennis would have its own Satan and, to avoid clashes with The Sandman (vol. 2), this version was turned in John Constantine, Hellblazer #59 (November 1992) into the First of the Fallen: the first being in Hell, preceding Lucifer and his failed rebellion in Heaven. The First and two other demons ruled Hell once Lucifer had abdicated the throne, with the two demons said to be only barely in charge, and in a fourth wall moment the First complained about "those endless, bloody triumvirates".  John Constantine the Hellblazer, to save himself from death from terminal lung cancer, set up the First to be killed by the succubus Chantinelle, who then briefly took control of Hell, but the First returned from the dead and reclaimed the throne of Hell shortly afterward. The First also killed the other two demons after he found out that they were not truly two of the Fallen after all (instead, they were only mere demons) and transformed their dead bodies into a two-bladed knife that was called the Knife of the Fallen, which was then used by Chantinelle to kill him.

The Master Baytor was nominally the ruler of Hell for a brief period, but spent the whole time babbling incoherently during his reign.

In The Sandman Presents: Lucifer #1–3 (March–May 1999) and the 75-issue series Lucifer (June 2000–August 2006; including a one-shot issue called Lucifer: Nirvana (2002)), a human was eventually placed in charge of Hell while Lucifer roamed Earth and owned a piano bar named Lux (the Latin word for "light") as depicted in the ninth Sandman story arc, The Kindly Ones, in Vertigo Jam #1 (August 1993) and The Sandman (vol. 2) #57–69 (February 1994–July 1995).

The six-issue miniseries Human Defense Corps (July–December 2003) detailed the U.S. military designation for demons as "Hostile Species NHH-014". The Human Defense Corps were able to defeat a minor Lord of the Damned named Scarmaglione, then Sergeant Montgomery Kelly of the Corps killed him, assumed his powers and claimed his clan for the United States of America. His status as a minor ruler of Hell was confirmed by no less an authority than Neron himself, who was still the ruler of Hell at that time.

Superman briefly became the Lord of Hell in Superman #666 (October 2007).

The eight-issue miniseries Reign in Hell, also including DC Universe Special: Reign in Hell #1 and created by Keith Giffen and Tom Derenick, introduced a new status quo for the mainstream DC Comics version of Hell; it also gave readers specific geographical references of the region and defined a codex of rules that governed the damned (however, it is also known to have had many internal continuity errors that make its place in mainstream DC Universe canon questionable at best). Two years after Reign in Hell, DC Comics decided to remove all DC Universe characters from their Vertigo imprint, though Vertigo would have its own version of John Constantine the Hellblazer for a time.

DC Comics

Description
In the mainstream DC Universe, Hell is an alternate plane of reality, traditionally accessible only by those with demonic heritage, beings of a higher order, and those whose souls have been barred from entering the Silver City because of any evil that they had committed in their lives. DC Comics' Hell is a debased reflection of Earth, meaning that as Earth became more technologically or socially advanced so did Hell, due to an effect not unlike time dilation: "[a] day in Hell is equal to a minute's passage on Earth". All denizens of the mainstream DC Comics version of Hell are capable of using some form of maleficium; the most powerful infernal magic users are the ruling gentry of Hell and their enforcers the Necro-Mages, Forges, Exegesis Guild, Renderers, Howlers, Incendiaries, Rhyming Demons and Wishweavers. Every building, weapon, piece of furniture, piece of armor, article of clothing, serving of food, etc. in Hell is made from the bodies of the damned. The damned are put through a process called rendering by the Exegesis Guild and their servants the Renderers to manufacture the raw materials of Hell.

Fictional history

Underworld Unleashed

During the Underworld Unleashed crossover event, Neron appeared in the mainstream DC Universe for the first time and established himself as the ruler of Hell, a position that he held for many years.

He then devised an elaborate scheme to conquer Earth and to gain a "pure soul" that he could corrupt, which ultimately involved many of the DC Universe's supervillains and a number of the DC Universe's superheroes. Neron offered both groups numerous deals to give them their greatest desires in exchange for their souls or for completing a task for him. The scheme was ultimately defeated by the combined efforts of both Justice League America and the Trickster I (Giovanni Giuseppe a.k.a. James Montgomery Jesse).

The Final Night

During The Final Night crossover story line, the Rhyming Demon known as Etrigan the Demon offered to bring all of the living people of Earth into Hell so that they could stay warm in exchange for their souls. The people rejected his offer, primarily because his plan was to shift Earth into Hell.

Day of Judgment

During the Day of Judgment crossover storyline, a renegade King-Angel of the Bull Host named Asmodel, with the help of Etrigan the Demon (who was trying to cause chaos on Earth and defeat his enemy, Neron), briefly took control of the then-hostless Spectre-Force using the ashes of an angel's wing feather and sought to destroy both Heaven and Hell. He used the Spectre's powers to extinguish the hellfire font, causing Hell to freeze over. A team of superheroes, including Superman, Zatanna Zatara, Sebastian Faust, Firestorm the Nuclear Man II (Ronald Roy "Ronnie" Raymond), the Atom II (Raymond "Ray" Palmer), the Enchantress and Deadman, were sent deep into Hell's depths to reignite the hellfire font. The reignition required an act of true evil, so Sebastian Faust took matters into his own hands and killed the Enchantress by slitting her throat, thereby damning himself to Hell and thus satisfying the infernal conditions.

The crossover storyline ended with a three-way battle between Neron, Asmodel and the then-deceased Harold "Hal" Jordan (the former Green Lantern II) for control over the Spectre-Force (which ultimately chose Hal Jordan, thus making him the Spectre for a time).

Reign in Hell

During the events of the Reign in Hell miniseries, Hell was thrown into a massive conflict while Neron and his generals are confronted with a rebellion led by Blaze and Satanus, the rulers of Purgatory. Neron soon discovered that the rebel demons were offering the damned "hope to the hopeless" and redemption for them, which had never happened before, and that this was a powerful spur. Realizing what would happen if the damned ever rose against him, Neron has his consort Lilith, the "mother of all Earthborn fiends", summon all of the vampires,  werewolves, ghouls and infernally powered humans to Hell to fight on his side.

This unrest in the infernal realms attracts the attention of Earth's magical superheroes, who are concerned with the outcome and possible repercussions of the war. Many of them descend into Hell and take sides in the conflict (all for reasons of their own), including Giovanni "John" Zatara, his daughter Zatanna Zatara, Jason Blood a.k.a. Etrigan the Demon, Randu Singh, Doctor Fate V (Kent V. Nelson), the Ragman III (Rory Regan), the Creeper II (Jack Ryder), Detective Chimp, the vampire Lord Andrew Bennett, Acheron,  the angel Zauriel, the Enchantress, Deadman, the Phantom Stranger, Sargon the Sorcerer II (David John Sargent), Ibis the Invincible II (Daniel Kasim "Danny" Khalifa), the Nightmaster, Nightshade II (Eve Eden), the Midnight Rider, the Warlock's Daughter, Black Alice, Blue Devil, Red Devil and the fallen angel Linda Danvers. In the miniseries' backup story, Doctor Richard Occult, aided by the Yellow Peri, also descends into Hell, but separately from the others and with his ulterior motive - to free the soul of his beloved, Rose Psychic, from damnation.

Lobo, who, at this time, is confined to the Labyrinth, Hell's only prison (due to the deal that he had earlier made with Neron in the Underworld Unleashed crossover event) and whose suffering alone is enough to power Neron's entire palace, is freed from his torment as a result of the titanic battle between Etrigan the Demon and Blue Devil, a battle that results in Etrigan the Demon's (temporary) death at Blue Devil's hands. Lobo then tears apart the soul of Zatara, which forces Zatanna to destroy his soul and banish it to the Abyss (a place that even Hell cannot touch) at his request, rather than to consign him to an eternity of pain and torment(later, in the 16-issue miniseries Zatanna (vol. 2) (July 2010–October 2011), Zatara's soul is shown to have been saved from destruction by a demon who owes him a favor).

Despite all of this and just when Neron seems to be victorious, Satanus finally reveals that he used the war as a cover to spread a modified viral version of DMN, the anagogic drug that changes humans into monsters and that he had used once before to destabilize Metropolis and confound Superman. This variation of DMN is airborne and, when combined with the speaking of the magic word "Shazam", it transforms Neron and all of Hell's demons into soulless humans, all except Lilith, who was not a true demon. It also causes all of the demonic entities that Neron had consumed over the millennia to be cast out of him. Satanus then kills Neron and takes the throne of Hell for himself. The damned then turn their rage upon the now-human and powerless demons, slaughtering them wholesale and thus damning themselves anew.

Blaze later takes advantage of her brother's momentary weakness during a moment when he allows Black Alice to touch him and sample his powers. This action shatters Black Alice's psyche and allows Blaze to drain Satanus' power and take the throne of Hell for herself, thus winning the war. Towards the end of the miniseries, the Unspoken Principium of Hell is revealed by Doctor Occult to be "You can leave whenever you want", reiterating what was said about Hell in the Neil Gaiman version. However, the miniseries is known to have many internal continuity errors that make its place in mainstream DC Universe canon questionable at best.

Geography
In the Reign in Hell miniseries, the Infernal Dominion is divided up into nine Provinces, each of which have their own rulers. All of the rulers of the Provinces bowed down to Neron, then to Satanus when he took the throne of Hell from Neron and then to Blaze when she did the same thing to Satanus. The Nine Provinces included Pandemonia, the Odium, the Gull, Praetori, Internecia, Ament, the Labyrinth, Err and Purgatory (below, there are descriptions of the Nine Provinces of the Infernal Dominion as depicted in the miniseries).

Pandemonia - The First Province, home of Hell's high-caste demons and the location of the throne of Hell, the seat of the Dominus or Domina.
The Odium - The Second Province, the industrial and manufacturing center. It is home of the rendering factories, the Exegesis Guild and the Renderers.
The Gull - The Third Province, the mercantile, and commerce center.
Praetori - The Fourth Province, the administrative and governmental ministries.
Internecia - The Fifth Province, the military and enforcement ministries.
Ament - The Sixth Province, the cultural propaganda ministry.
The Labyrinth - The Seventh Province, the judicial detainment ministry, and Hell's only prison.
Err - The Eighth Province, the theological suppression ministry.
Purgatory - The Ninth Province, the place of secondary damnation. It was formerly ruled by Blaze and Satanus. Anyone can leave Purgatory and enter Hell, but they can never leave Hell once they have arrived there.
The Selvage - The Selvage is the infernal aether, a dimensional waste which separates and surrounds the Provinces; all passage between the Provinces must pass through the Selvage. The very nature of the Selvage is such that it rejects magic.
Masak Mavdil - The lowest place in Hell; the pit of rejected failures where demons exile their own kind, and which is guarded by the Archfiend Abaddon the Destroyer.

The Infernal Hosts
According to the Reign in Hell miniseries, Blaze, the sister of Satanus, is the current ruler of Hell; she succeeded her brother who, in turn, succeeded Neron. The mainstream DC Comics version of Hell always has a single ruler known as the "First Seated of the Entire Infernal Dominion" and holding the title of either Dominus (male) or Domina (female); the first such Dominus was Neron, the current Domina is Blaze, sister of Satanus and daughter of the wizard Shazam and a demoness (name unknown).

The First Seated rules by his (or her) "infernal will and chthonic way"; he (or she) is addressed as the  "Lord"  (or "Lady") "of the Hosts of Hell, First Seated of the Entire Infernal Dominion".

The First Seated of the Entire Infernal Dominion
Blaze - The former co-ruler of Purgatory; the current Domina, the First Seated of the Entire Infernal Dominion and the hybrid daughter of the wizard Shazam and a demoness (name unknown).
Satanus - The former co-ruler of Purgatory; the former Dominus, the First Seated of the Entire Infernal Dominion and the hybrid son of the wizard Shazam and a demoness (name unknown).
Neron - Neron is also known as the "King of Hate" and the "Lord of Lies". He was a high-ranking Wishweaver who mysteriously emerged from obscurity several years ago and soon established himself as the ruler of Hell, a position that he held for many years. He is the former Dominus, the First Seated of the Entire Infernal Dominion.

Archfiends
Abaddon the Destroyer - The guardian and oracle of Masak Mavdil, the lowest place in Hell.
Asmodel - A renegade King-Angel and the former leader of the Bull Host, an elite order of angels tasked with protecting the Silver City. Asmodel served as Neron's Dominion Overseer, in charge of the armies of the Infernal Dominion.
Asteroth - Asteroth once captured Merlin I and Etrigan the Demon in a failed attempt to disrupt the political structure of Hell.
Belial - The father of the demons Lord Scapegoat and Etrigan the Demon and of the half-human/half-demon hybrid wizard Merlin I (who all had different mothers; see below). Belial physically resembled his son Etrigan the Demon. He also served as Neron's Archfiend of Internal Security; his spies kept watch on demon and damned alike.
Lilith the Mother of Monsters - The mother of all Earthbound monsters and the first wife of the human progenitor Adam in Judeo-Christian mythology. She held dominion over any human empowered by infernal energies, as well as the lilim, incubi, succubi, vampires, werewolves and ghouls.
Myrddin Ambrosius - Myrddin Ambrosius is the modern-day version of DC Comics' original version of Merlin I as introduced in the 12-issue maxiseries The Trials of Shazam! (October 2006–May 2008). He is the youngest son of Belial, born of a blasphemous mating between his father and a human woman (name unknown), and the younger half-brother of the demons Lord Scapegoat and Etrigan the Demon.
Mordecai Smyt - A tactical genius from the Crusades who served as one of Satanus' generals.
Nebiros - The ruler of an unnamed Infernal Province and an enemy of both the Swamp Thing IV ("Alexander "Alec" Holland") and Blue Devil.
Prince Ra-Man the Mind-Master - A powerful magician who served as Satanus' Secretary of State.
Rann Va Dath of the Pit - The Serpent Queen and the Spirit of Deceit, also a former mate of Belial and the mother of Etrigan the Demon.
Shamma - A protoplasmic shapeshifter who served as Satanus' Chief of Intelligence.
The Thing-That-Cannot-Die - A resident of a prison called the "Region Beyond", which may be a section of the Labyrinth.
Trigon - The ruler of an unnamed Infernal Province and the father of Raven VI.

Fiends
The Abortives - The Abortives are the lowest caste of demons, creatures born in Hell without a language or the ability to travel. They can only escape from Hell by inhabiting a "hollow" - the demonic term for a human with a body and a mind, but without a soul.
The Arkannone - The "Lords of Gunfire".
Azmodus - An enemy of the Spectre created by the union of Caraka (the Spectre's first human host) and the demon Sekuba.
Baphomet - A 6th century demon who battled Arak, Son of Thunder.
Bathopet, Maw and Atopeh - A trio of demons who were offered to Madame Xanadu - along with the power to command and control them - by Neron during the Underworld Unleashed crossover event in exchange for her soul when she died. Madame Xanadu accepted the offer only to trick Neron because she was immortal and, therefore, could not die. Neron, however, in a cruel twist, revealed to Madame Xanadu that he had only made a deal with her just to prove that he could tempt those with "gray souls" as well as those who were evil.
Black Nergal - A demon who fought Doctor Fate I (Kent Nelson) in More Fun Comics #67 (May 1941). He may be the same being as Vertigo's Nergal.
Bloodklott the Prince of Pox - A Rhyming Demon who is terrible at rhyming and a sometimes ally of Etrigan the Demon.
Etrigan the Demon - The middle son of Belial, born of a mating between his father and Rann Va Dath of the Pit, and a prominent Rhyming Demon who once made an attempt to claim the throne of Hell for himself and failed to do so.
The Exegesis Guild - One of the Infernal Hosts, the Exegesis Guild controls manufacturing in the Odium; their servants - also one of the Infernal Hosts - are the Renderers, infernal machines which are Hell's architects, capable of transmuting damned souls into building materials and using the rendered brick and mortar in their projects.
The Forges - One of the Infernal Hosts, the Forges are infernal robotic constructs built by the Exegesis Guild; they are tasked with scouring anomalies from Hell.
Grockk the Devil's Son - Due to his unique facial appearance, Grockk the Devil's Son appears to be related to Etrigan the Demon. A Dial H for Hero supervillain.
The Howlers - One of the Infernal Hosts, the Howlers are described as lycanthropes, so they appear to be infernal werewolves. They have also been mentioned in Merlin I's book of spells titled The Book of Eternity and have been known to work for Morgaine le Fey.
The Incendiaries - One of the Infernal Hosts, the Incendiaries are living hellfire constructs used by Satanus' armies.
Lord Scapegoat - The oldest son of Belial, born of a blasphemous mating between his father and a nanny (female) goat, and a sometimes ally of his younger half-brother Etrigan the Demon.
Morax - The Bull-Beast of Stygia and a sometimes ally of Etrigan the Demon.
The Necro-Mages - One of the Infernal Hosts, the Necro-Mages, while under Neron's rule, were tasked with monitoring all magical activity in Hell.
Rhavenj - A purple, minotaur-like demon of vengeance from Action Comics #569 (July 1985).
The Rhyming Demons - One of the Infernal Hosts, the Rhyming Demons (like Etrigan the Demon) are compelled to rhyme all spoken word conversations.
The Scabbies - One of the Infernal Hosts; according to the Yellow Peri, the Scabbies are former angels who were captured and tortured by demons, becoming demons themselves in the process. They appear to have also become cannibals, feeding on demon and damned alike.
Shathan the Eternal - A giant demon who ruled Dis and fought the Spectre in Showcase #61 (March–April 1966).
The Wishweavers - One of the Infernal Hosts, the Wishweavers are demons who specialize in fulfilling mortals' greatest desires in exchange for their immortal souls or for completing a task for them, usually by making deals with said mortals (with such deals usually not ending well for the mortals). Neron is the most prominent, powerful and well-known Wishweaver and, possibly, might have been their ruler.
Xolotl - The demon guardian of the "Mictlan Gate" and the servant of Lord Mictlāntēcutli, the Aztec god of death.

Notable damned
Baal - A Semitic fertility and storm god who is confined to a temple that is hidden in an unnamed corner of Hell.
Buzz - Buzz was born Gaius Marcus, a Roman patrician from A.D. 41; he was a frequent enemy of the fallen angel Linda Danvers.
Chthon - One of Echidna's monstrous children and the guardian of the "Pillars of Unreason".
Daemon - An incubus who assaulted Supergirl.
The Demons Three (Abnegazar, Rath and Ghast) - Three proto-demons who predate humanity and yet, at the same time, are among the many children of Lilith.
Echidna - The Mother of Monsters in Greek mythology, to whom Power Girl promises to return once a year for instruction.
Lobo - An intergalactic bounty hunter and a former prisoner in the Labyrinth, Lobo was briefly tormented by Neron when he was "Lord of the Hosts of Hell, First Seated of the Entire Infernal Dominion". His suffering in Hell alone was enough to power Neron's entire palace.
Mawzir - The 10-armed and gun-wielding Nazi hit man of Hell.

Lesser damned
Barbariccia - A demonic astral guard.
Calcabrina - A demon from Scarmaglione's clan who was captured by the Human Defense Corps.
The Master Baytor - The former Lord of the Criminally Insane in Hell and a sometimes ally of Etrigan the Demon, who later escaped from Hell and became a bartender at Noonan's Bar in the Cauldron, a section of Gotham City.
Scarmaglione - A minor demon-lord from the Human Defense Corps six-issue miniseries.
Sergeant Montgomery Kelly - A member of the Human Defense Corps; he killed the minor demon-lord Scarmaglione, assumed his powers and succeeded him as ruler of his clan, claiming it for the United States of America. His status as a minor ruler of Hell was confirmed by no less an authority than Neron himself.
Spot (a.k.a. The Beast With No Name and Stanley's Monster) - A minor demon who was banished from Hell to Earth by Lucifer for being "too nice" for Hell and has befriended a human named Stanley Dover Junior. Hell has tried to reclaim this demon many times without any success.

Notable half-demons
Black Alice - A young woman whose infernally-made powers allow her to steal magical energy.
Blue Devil - A former stuntman turned superhero.
The Creeper II (Jack Ryder) - A superhero who is a human that has somehow been bonded to a demon.
Felix Faust - A damned sorcerer.
Linda Danvers - A fallen angel summoned to Hell by Lilith the Mother of Monsters, but mysteriously released shortly afterward.
Lord Satanis - A warlock (real name unknown) from the distant future who sold his soul to a demon-lord (name unknown) in exchange for power while living in 14th century Great Britain.
Raven VI (Rachel Roth) - The hybrid daughter of the Archfiend Trigon (see above) and a human woman named Arella.
Sabbac - A cursed human able to take on demonic power by saying the magic word "Sabbac".
Sebastian Faust - The son of Felix Faust, who is also a sorcerer and damned like his father, but is a superhero (while his father is a supervillain).
The White Magician - A powerful human warlock who is able to summon a demonic aspect of himself after selling his soul to one of Hell's demons.
Witchfire - A homunculus sorceress.

Infernal artifacts
The Ace of Winchesters - A powerful demon-forged Winchester rifle that is capable of killing any mortal or immortal being, no matter who - or what - that being might be.
The Crown of Horns - A powerful magical artifact that is supposedly worn by some of the rulers of Hell.
The Trident of Lucifer - A powerful magical weapon with the ability to return exiled demons to Hell; it is currently in the possession of Blue Devil.

Other versions
According to the six-issue miniseries Artemis: Requiem (June–November 1996) by William Messner-Loebs and Ed Benes and the second story in Wonder Woman Annual (vol. 2) #6 (1997) by Joan Weis and Ed Benes (which do not take place in mainstream DC Universe canon), there are 13 princely thrones in Hell, each selected to oversee 13 different realms of it. It is then assumed that these demon princes ultimately answer to the crowned head of Hell. The demoness Belyllioth is Princess of 1/13th of Hell's realms in these stories. She supposedly replaced the previous ruler, Dalkriig-Hath, once he was destroyed by his bride Artemis of Bana-Mighdall. Artemis was, by right, next in line to rule her former husband's realm, but instead she had the other 12 Princes of Hell grant Belyllioth her station instead. Notable in this depiction were the Myrmidons, a race of savage ant-like demons that were faithful to Belyllioth.

Vertigo

Description

The Vertigo imprint of DC Comics also has its own version of Hell, with its own very specific infernal sovereignty formerly ruled by Lucifer Samael Morningstar.

Fictional history
Contrary to popular belief, the term Satan (a Hebrew word meaning "adversary") represents a title within the legions of Hell and is not an actual name. The most well-known Satan is Lucifer Samael Morningstar, whose rule supplanted both that of the First of the Fallen and the First Triumvirate and Etrigan the Demon and the Second Triumvirate. Lucifer was the fourth fallen angel and yet not the first ruler of Hell, though he later became the ruler of Hell for many centuries. When the Great Evil Beast threatened all of existence by making an attack on Creation during the Crisis on Infinite Earths, a civil war erupted in Hell as a result and the regency was split into the Second Triumvirate, which consisted of Etrigan the Demon, his mother Rann Va Dath of the Pit and Abaddon the Destroyer. This was only an interim triumvirate, however, and it was soon replaced by the Third Triumvirate. Eventually, Lucifer grew bored with his position, abdicated the throne of Hell and retired to Earth with his mistress, the lilim known as Mazikeen.

Geography
The realms of the Vertigo version of Hell are not as defined as the ones in the DC Comics version after the Reign in Hell miniseries, but specific areas have been mentioned in various stories.

Dis - A Hellcity, home to the palace of Lucifer Samael Morningstar.
Effrul - The home Province of Lord Arux, an Arch-Duke of Hell.
Mashkan-Shapir - A Hellcity formerly ruled by Nergal, an Arch-Duke of Hell.

Infernal sovereignty
The hierarchy of the Vertigo version of Hell has changed several times over the millennia, the ruler of which has always assumed the title of Satan. There are also ranks among the demons, including Kings, Queens, Princes, Lords, Arch-Dukes, Dukes and several others as well. Eventually, Lucifer grew bored with his position, abandoned Hell entirely, forced every being within it out of it, closed its gates behind him, locked them and gave its key to Dream of the Endless, who eventually gave it to two angels, Remiel and Duma, who then transformed Hell into a place of spiritual rehabilitation rather than eternal punishment. In the interim, Lucifer was shown as the ruler of Hell in the mainstream DC Comics series The Spectre (vol. 2) #1–31 (April 1987–November 1989, plus one Annual (1988)) and The Demon (vol. 3) #1–58 (July 1990–May 1995, plus two Annuals (1992 and 1993) and one #0 issue (October 1994)) and the mainstream DC Comics miniseries Stanley and His Monster (vol. 2) #1–4 (February–May 1993).

The Triumvirs of Hell (both DC Comics (Second) and Vertigo (First and Third))

The First Triumvirate
The First of the Fallen - The first being created and the first to be banished to Hell.
The Second of the Fallen - The second being created and the second to be banished to Hell. Killed by the First of the Fallen after the First discovered that the Second was not truly one of the Fallen after all, but was merely a demon.
The Third of the Fallen - The third being created and the third to be banished to Hell. Killed by the First of the Fallen for the same reason that the Second was killed.

The Second Triumvirate
Lucifer Samael Morningstar - The fourth being created and the fourth to be banished to Hell.
Azazel the Abomination - A former djinn ("genie") who ascended to Lucifer's triumvirate.
Beelzebub the Lord of the Flies - A prominent Arch-Duke of Hell who was later promoted to Lucifer's triumvirate alongside Lucifer and Azazel.

The Third Triumvirate
Etrigan the Demon - A prominent Rhyming Demon, he established this interim triumvirate at a time when he had - or when he thought that he had - conquered the power of Hell.
Rann Va Dath of the Pit - The Serpent Queen and the Spirit of Deceit; also, a former mate of Belial (Etrigan the Demon's father) and the mother of Etrigan the Demon.
Abaddon the Destroyer - The guardian and oracle of Masak Mavdil, the lowest place in Hell.

Lesser demons

Arch-Dukes of Hell
Adramalech - An ally of Timothy Hunter.
Lord Arux - The ruler of the Province of Effrul and the father of Brosag and Lady Lys, the latter of whom succeeds him as ruler.
Mazikeen - The lilim mistress of Lucifer.
Nergal - The former ruler of the Hellcity of Mashkan-Shapir and the Arch-Duke of Mendacity; he was demoted from his rule by the First of the Fallen. He may be the same being as DC Comics' Black Nergal.

In his appearance in Constantine the Hellblazer #8–13, Neron is mentioned as now being an Arch-Duke of Hell (a far cry from the ruler of Hell that he had once been) by no less an authority than John Constantine the Hellblazer himself.

Dukes of Hell
Agares - A minor Duke of Hell and a possible future servant of Timothy Hunter.
Asmodeus - A minor Duke of Hell who is believed to be the hybrid son of the Phantom Stranger and a human woman named Naamah, who was apparently damned to Hell for daring to love an angel (this angel is later strongly hinted to have become the Phantom Stranger himself sometime after the incident).

Minor gentry
Braid the Assassin - Braid was sent by Remiel and Lord Arux to kill Lucifer but failed in his mission and died.
Cerberus the Hellhound I - The three-headed watchdog of the gates of Hell; he allowed the souls of the dead to enter into Hell - if they had paid Charon the Ferryman his fare of a gold coin - but none to leave and also prevented the living from entering - or leaving if they did somehow manage to enter - as well. He especially devoured all those who tried to leave Hell without permission.
Charon the Ferryman - The blind ferryman of the river Styx; he transported the souls of the dead across this river in his boat- for a fare of a gold coin - to the gates of Hell.

Notable half-demons
John Constantine the Hellblazer - A dilettante con man, thief, exorcist and minor wizard.

Infernal artifacts
The Knife of the Fallen - A two-bladed knife created by the First of the Fallen from the dead bodies of the Second of the Fallen and the Third of the Fallen.

In other media

Television
Hell exists in the CW's Arrowverse. It was first mentioned in season 4 of Arrow, where Oliver Queen stated that he could not call for John Constantine's help, because he was literally in Hell. Hell was then depicted in season 4 of Legends of Tomorrow, where Constantine and Nora Darhk traveled there to rescue Ray Palmer's soul. The Arrowverse's version of the Triumvirate of Hell was made up of the demons Beelzebub, Belial and Satan, who were engaged in a power struggle against another demon, Neron.

References

External links
DCU Guide: Hell
DCU Guide: Demons
DCU Guide: Etrigan the Demon
DCU Guide: Neron
DCU Guide: Blaze 
DCU Guide: Satanus 
DCU Guide: The Triumvirate of Hell
DCU Guide: The First of the Fallen
DCU Guide: The Second of the Fallen
DCU Guide: The Third of the Fallen
DCU Guide: Lucifer Morningstar
DCU Guide: Azazel
DCU Guide: Beelzebub

The Sandman (comic book)
The Books of Magic
DC Comics demons
Hell in popular culture
Mythology in DC Comics